Buchan Airport  is a public airport located in Englewood, Florida, United States, and operated/owned by Sarasota County.

History
A plat for the subdivision was filed with Sarasota County on April 21, 1925. The subdivision never broke ground due to the end of the Florida land boom of the 1920s.

In April 1949, Sarasota County bought  of the land for $100 in back taxes with help from former county commissioner Peter E. Buchan, to build an airport.

The airport helped facilitate aerial spraying for the county's mosquito eradication program.

References

External links

Airports in Florida
Transportation buildings and structures in Sarasota County, Florida
Airports established in 1949
1949 establishments in Florida